Yan Yuxin (born 28 January 1987) is a Chinese news anchor for China Central Television, the main state announcer of China. He is known all over China as an announcer for the 7:00 pm CCTV News program Xinwen Lianbo, which has reach all over China on various networks and internationally, is one of the most watched news programs in the world.

Biography
Yan was born in Beijing, on January 28, 1987, while his ancestral home in Shaanxi. He graduated from the Communication University of China. In 2007, he became an intern in Taizhou radio and TV station. In 2008, he joined the China Central Television and became a news anchor for CCTV-13. He hosted Xinwen Lianbo since September 23, 2020.

Television
Midnight News
Morning News
Xinwen Lianbo

References

1987 births
Living people
People from Beijing
Communication University of China alumni
CCTV newsreaders and journalists